The 2024 United States House of Representatives elections in Florida will be held on November 5, 2024, to elect the 28 U.S. Representatives from the state of Florida, one from each of the state's congressional districts. The elections will coincide with the U.S. presidential election, as well as other elections to the House of Representatives, elections to the United States Senate, and various state and local elections.

District 9 

The 9th district includes much of Greater Orlando, streching from eastern Orlando towards Yeehaw Junction and including the cities of Kissimmee and St. Cloud. The incumbent is Democrat Darren Soto, who was re-elected with 53.6% of the vote in 2022.

Democratic primary

Potential 
 Darren Soto, incumbent U.S. Representative

General election

Predictions

District 11 

The 11th district consists of a portion of Central Florida, including The Villages and the western Orlando suburbs. The incumbent is Republican Daniel Webster, who was re-elected with 63.1% of the vote in 2022.

Republican primary

Potential 
 Daniel Webster, incumbent U.S. Representative

General election

Predictions

District 13 

The 13th district includes most of Pinellas County, including the cities of Largo, Clearwater, and Palm Harbor, as well as a western portion of St. Petersburg. The incumbent is Republican Anna Paulina Luna, who flipped the district and was elected with 53.1% of the vote in 2022.

Republican primary

Potential 
 Anna Paulina Luna, incumbent U.S. Representative

General election

Predictions

District 16 

The 16th district encompasses Manatee County and eastern Hillsborough County, taking in Tampa's eastern suburbs, including Riverview and parts of Brandon. The incumbent is Republican Vern Buchanan, who was re-elected with 62.2% of the vote in 2022.

Republican primary

Potential 
 Vern Buchanan, incumbent U.S. Representative

Declined 
 Jim Boyd, state senator

General election

Predictions

District 23 

The 23rd district covers parts of Broward County and southern Palm Beach County, including the cities of Boca Raton, Coral Springs, and most of Deerfield Beach and Fort Lauderdale. The incumbent is Democrat Jared Moskowitz, who was elected with 51.6% of the vote in 2022.

Democratic primary

Potential 
 Jared Moskowitz, incumbent U.S. Representative

General election

Predictions

District 25 

The incumbent is Democrat Debbie Wasserman Schultz, who was re-elected with 55.1% of the vote in 2022.

Democratic primary

Potential 
 Debbie Wasserman Schultz, incumbent U.S. Representative

Republican primary

Declared 
 Chris Eddy, Weston city commissioner

General election

Predictions

District 27 

The 27th district includes parts of southern Miami, including Downtown, Little Havana, and Kendall, as well as Palmetto Estates and parts of Fontainebleau and Westchester. The incumbent is Republican María Elvira Salazar, who was re-elected with 57.3% of the vote in 2022.

Republican primary

Potential 
 María Elvira Salazar, incumbent U.S. Representative

General election

Predictions

References 

2024
Florida
United States House of Representatives